Echinopsis haematantha,  is a species of Echinopsis found in Argentina and Bolivia.

References

External links
 
 

haematantha